Dragon beard noodles are a variety of noodle from Shandong province in China. They derive their name from their long, thin appearance, said to resemble the beard of a Chinese dragon. They are traditionally eaten during the Longtaitou Festival, which occurs on the second day of the second month of the Chinese calendar. There is a folk custom called "peeling the dragon skin" (pinyin: “bolongpi”).

History
The noodles are believed to have been invented by a chef working for the emperor during the Ming dynasty. During lichun, the chef made some unusually long and thin noodles which delighted the emperor, and later became popular among peasants as well. Because of their association with dragons, the noodles began to be eaten during the Longtaitou (lit. "dragon raising its head") festival, which celebrates dragons and the role they play in bringing the Spring rains.

Manufacturing Steps

Dough making
Pulling into noodles
Deep frying

External links

A master of Dragon beard noodles called Wang Zhanglong displays his skills.
Dragon beard noodles as a carrier are widely used in advertisements.

References

Chinese noodles